Erythraea or Erythraia was a town of ancient Crete. The town which, from its mention by Florus along with Cydonia and Cnossus as submitting to Quintus Caecilius Metellus Creticus, must have been a place of importance, and probably was situated near the promontory called Erythraeum.

The site of Erythraea is unlocated.

References

Populated places in ancient Crete
Former populated places in Greece
Lost ancient cities and towns